Cecil Lee Rouson (born October 18, 1962) is a former professional American football running back. He played a total of seven seasons for the National Football League (NFL) New York Giants and Cleveland Browns. He was selected as the NFL Special Teams Player of the Year in 1986.

Early life
Rouson was born in Elizabeth City, North Carolina. His family later moved to Greensboro, North Carolina where he attended Page High School and was an older football teammate of former NFL wide receiver Haywood Jeffires. After high school Rouson attended the University of Colorado. While playing for the Buffaloes he earned Freshman All Big Eight team honors in 1981, was an honorable mention All Big Eight Player of the Year, and participated in the Blue–Gray Football Classic. Rouson is 4th on the list of Buffaloes all-time leading rushers.

Professional career
Lee Rouson was drafted in the 8th round of the 1985 NFL Draft by the New York Giants, the #213th player taken overall. Rouson saw little playing time his first year, appearing in only two games rushing for one yard on one attempt. The next season, he would see considerably more playing time, appearing in 14 games. Serving on special teams and backing up Giants running back Joe Morris, Rouson had 54 carries for 179 yards and two touchdowns, plus eight receptions for 121 yards and a third touchdown. He played a notable role in the Giants 39–20 win over the Denver Broncos in Super Bowl XXI, primarily returning kicks but also rushing for 22 yards on three carries plus a 23-yard reception from quarterback Phil Simms in the third quarter.  Rouson continued as a solid player for the Giants through the 1990 season, capping it with a second Super Bowl ring as New York edged the Buffalo Bills 20–19 in Super Bowl XXV. Lee Rouson's final season in the NFL was spent as a tight end and fullback for the Cleveland Browns before suffering a career-ending ankle injury.

Rouson credits former football coaches Bill Parcells, Bill Belichick and Bill McCartney for his success.

Life after football
Lee Rouson works as a motivational speaker for Sports World Ministries, travelling to schools and churches around the United States. Rouson is also an associate pastor at New Horizon Community Church and has served as northern New Jersey director for the Fellowship of Christian Athletes. He lives in Flanders section of Mount Olive Township, New Jersey. Rouson and wife Lisa, a Registered Nurse and Director of Oncology, are the parents of four children; two boys, two girls. 
In the early 2000's Rouson started coaching Football at Mount Olive High School, Mount Olive Township School District.

He was a mentor at Mount Olive High School and Chester M. Stephens Elementary School.
Rouson's son, Jas Lee Rouson was a running back for Towson University.

References

1962 births
Living people
People from Elizabeth City, North Carolina
American football running backs
Colorado Buffaloes football players
New York Giants players
Cleveland Browns players
American motivational speakers
People from Mount Olive Township, New Jersey
People from Greensboro, North Carolina